Carl Clark (1933–2015) was an American photographer and United States Army veteran.

About 
Born as Carlton L. Clark in Boston, Massachusetts on 1933. Clark spent most of the latter part of his life working in Baltimore, Maryland where he captured views of African American life. After serving three combat tours in Korea and Vietnam, he earned a bachelor's degree in Sociology from the University of Nebraska, followed then a bachelor's degree in Fine Arts from the Maryland Institute College of Art.

Clark's photographs have been on exhibit at the Baltimore Museum of Art, Brooklyn Museum of Art, Maryland Art Place, the Museum of Fine Arts, Houston, the Museum of the National Center of Afro-American Artists in Boston, the Royal Photographic Society of England, the Smithsonian Institution, and School 33 Art Center in Baltimore.

References

External links 
Artist's website https://web.archive.org/web/20160308042705/http://www.carlclark.net/

1933 births
2015 deaths
African-American history in Boston
Artists from Boston
Artists from Baltimore
Maryland Institute College of Art alumni
University of Nebraska alumni
African-American photographers
20th-century African-American people
21st-century African-American people